HMS Valhalla was an Admiralty V-class flotilla leader built for the Royal Navy.  She was named after the home of the Norse gods.  She was one of 2 destroyers ordered in July 1916 from Cammell Laird shipyard in Birkenhead under the 9th Order for Destroyers of the Emergency War Program of 1916–17.

Construction
Valhallas keel was laid on 8 August 1916 at the Cammell Laird Shipyard in Birkenhead.  She was launched on 22 May 1917.  She was 312 feet overall in length with a beam of 29.5 feet.  Her mean draught was 9 feet, and would reach 11.25 feet under full load.  She had a displacement of 1,339 tons.

She was propelled by three Yarrow-type water tube boilers powering Parsons geared steam turbines developing  and driving two screws for a maximum designed speed of 34 knots.  She was oil-fired and had a bunkerage of 320 to 370 tons.  This gave a range of 3,500 nautical miles at 15 knots.

She was armed with 4 QF  Mk V L/45 guns in four single centre-line turrets.  The turrets were disposed as two forward and two aft in superimposed firing positions.  She also carried one QF  20 cwt anti-aircraft gun aft of the second funnel.  Aft of the 3-inch gun, she carried four 21-inch torpedo tubes mounted in pairs on the centre-line.

History
Valhalla was commissioned into the Royal Navy on 31 July 1917.  She was deployed in home waters until the end of World War I.  In the reorganization of the Royal Navy she was assigned to the 6th Destroyer Flotilla assigned to the Atlantic Fleet and given the pennant number D44. In the late 1920s she was placed in reserve at Rosyth.

Disposition
In 1931 she was stricken from the active list and scrapped.

Notes

Bibliography

 
 
 
 

 
 

 

V and W-class destroyers of the Royal Navy
Ships built on the River Mersey
1919 ships
World War I destroyers of the United Kingdom